Pakistanis in Saudi Arabia are either Pakistani people who live in Saudi Arabia even though having been born outside Saudi Arabia or are Saudi Arabian-born, but have Pakistani roots. By Pakistani roots, this could mean roots linking back to Pakistan or Pakistani diaspora or South Asia. Many Pakistani army officers and soldiers also serve in Saudi Arabia and train the Saudi military cadets. According to a 2020 estimate, 1.06 million Pakistanis live and work in Saudi Arabia as of 2020.

Culture
There are numerous restaurants, shops and cultural activities in Saudi Arabia which cater to Pakistani diaspora. In Jeddah, Azizia district is perhaps the best place to get Pakistani foods and shops. There is a huge Pakistani community living there due to the close proximity of the Pakistani School in Jeddah. Sharfia and Baghdadia district are other districts having significant Pakistanis living there. Similarly, Al Shemaisy and Al Manfuha are the best areas with amenities related to the community i.e. Pakistani food, embroidery, grocery etc. There is also the presence of Pakistani community on a vast scale.

Education

To meet the requirement of the education, there are Pakistani schools in large cities of Saudi Arabia. They are known as International Schools with the name of the city comes after where the school is situated. They follow Pakistani national curriculum apart from Pakistan International School (English Section), Jeddah, which follow British Curriculum.

Riyadh: Pakistan International School, Riyadh - Largest School catering to Pakistani residents in Riyadh. Pakistan International School, English Section provides IGCSE and A-Level education to the Pakistani community

Jeddah: Pakistan International School, Jeddah and Pakistan International School (English Section), Jeddah

Jubail: Pakistan International School, Jubail

Taif: Pakistan International School, Taif

Al-Hassa: Pakistan International School, Al-Hasa

Al-Khobar: Pakistan International School, Al-Khobar

Al-Madina Al-Aqeeq international school, Al-Madina
There are many private schools which cater to other educational needs of students.

Notable Pakistanis in Saudi Arabia 
In 1957, Pakistani expatriate Anwar Ali became the governor of SAMA (Saudi Arabian Monetary Fund), who had come to the country with an International Monetary Fund mission and who held the post as a confidant of King Faisal until his death, in 1974.
Nawaz Sharif - spent eight years in self exile upon an agreement with Pervez Musharraf and Saad Hariri. Returned to Pakistan in 2007.
 General Raheel Shareef - Ex-Chief Of Army Staff, Pakistan is currently the chief of Joint Islamic Forces, Saudi Arabia.

Saudi citizens of Pakistani descent
 Ghulam Akbar Khan Niazi, military physician 
 Umer Chapra, economist
 Abdullah Alam Rashid, Ministry of Agriculture a Punjabi-Pakistani Civil Engineer who helped build and map Saudi roadways connecting Riyadh to Jeddah in the early 1900s. Alam Rashid created and mapped the roadways and major connections between two of the most populous cities in the Kingdom leading to the discovery of habitat, natural resources and settlements. In recognition of his services to the Kingdom, he was granted citizenship and the highest civilian honor for his services.

Deportation
In four months, Saudi Arabia Deportation at least 40,000 Pakistanis due to involvement of a number of Pakistani nationals due to visa issue and violation of the rules of residence and work. In report it was estimated that 250,000 Pakistanis have been deported in various countries in three years. Of them 131,643 were deportation from Saudi Arabia.

Media
Urdu News targets Pakistanis living in Saudi Arabia, providing them news in their native language, Urdu.
Bazm E Shaheen is also a community run organization which organizes events for the Pakistani community in Saudi Arabia.

See also 
Pakistan – Saudi Arabia relations

References

Bibliography 

Pakistani diaspora in Saudi Arabia